Anaxarcha limbata is a species of praying mantis found in India, Sumatra, and Borneo.

See also
 List of mantis genera and species

References

L
Mantodea of Asia
Mantodea of Southeast Asia
Insects of Borneo
Insects of India
Insects of Indonesia
Insects of Malaysia
Fauna of Sumatra
Insects described in 1915